Conocybe tenera is a widely distributed member of the genus Conocybe.  This mushroom is the type species for the genus Conocybe.

Description
Conocybe tenera is a small saprotrophic mushroom with a conic to convex cap and is smooth and colored cinnamon brown.  It is usually less than 2 cm across and is striate almost to the center.   The gills are adnate and colored pale brown, darkening in age.   The spores are yellowish brown, smooth and ellipsoid with a germ pore, measuring 12 x 6 micrometres.  The stem is 3 to 9 cm long, 1.5 mm thick, and is equal width for the whole length, sometimes with some swelling at the base.  It lacks an annulus (ring), is hollow and pruinose near the top.

Distribution and habitat

Widely distributed across the world.  Found in meadows and cities.

Edibility

The species is inedible, and is related to at least one species which contains the deadly amatoxin.

References

Further reading
 
 Mushroom Observer - Conocybe Tenera 
 Conocybe Tenera Photos 
 Rogers Mushrooms - Conocybe Tenera Photos 

Bolbitiaceae
Fungi of Europe
Fungi of North America
Fungi described in 1889
Inedible fungi
Taxa named by Jacob Christian Schäffer